{{DISPLAYTITLE:C25H41NO7}}
The molecular formula C25H41NO7 (molar mass: 467.60 g/mol, exact mass: 467.2883 u) may refer to:

 Delsoline
 Lycoctonine

Molecular formulas